Azhagai Irukkirai Bayamai Irukkirathu also known by the initialism AIBI, is a 2006 Indian Tamil-language romantic comedy film written and directed by cinematographer-turned-director S.D. Vijay Milton. It stars Bharath and Mallika Kapoor (making her Tamil film debut) with Arun Vijay, Deepu, Renuka and M. S. Baskar in vital supporting roles. The film's score and soundtrack are composed by Yuvan Shankar Raja. The film — inspired by the 1997 Hollywood film Addicted to Love, starring Matthew Broderick and Meg Ryan — was released on 14 April 2006. Upon release, the film was dubbed into Telugu and released as Maha Andamga Vunnavani Bhayam. The story tells a love relationship between two playful youngsters and their sacrifices.

Plot
Mano loves Nandhini, but Nandhini is in love with Prem. On the other hand, he meets Jo who is in love with Prem. The two team up together to break them apart so that Mano can be with Nandhini and Jo with Prem.Then they both try to break Prem's love with Nandhini and succeed. Mano realizes Jo's deep love for Prem and unites them. Mano succeeds in making Prem fall in love with Jo. Finally, Jo and Prem get married. During the story, the twists reveal that Mano had originally been in love with Jo but secretly tried to engage into her life by pretending to be in love with Nandhini. Soon after realising her true love for Prem, he sacrifices his love for her and brings Prem and Jo together. Only in the last several scenes does Jo realise Mano's love for her, but she chooses to go with Prem.

Cast

Soundtrack

The music of Azhagai Irukkirai Bayamai Irukkirathu was scored by Yuvan Shankar Raja and includes composing the soundtrack which was released on 25 March 2006. It features five tracks with lyrics written by Na. Muthukumar and Rajamurugan. Director Vijay Milton mentioned that first the scenes were shot and then Yuvan Shankar Raja composed the tunes after watching the filmed sequences. Yuvan Shankar Raja lent his voice for all the songs in his movie for the first time, whilst one of the songs features 10 singers, including the film's lead actor Bharath. Though earlier reports indicated that Yuvan Shankar Raja's father Ilaiyaraaja would sing one song with his son to depict the father-son relationship, there was no such track found on the soundtrack or in the film itself.

The soundtrack was re-recorded for the Telugu release and released through Aditya Music.

References

External links
 
 

2006 films
2000s Tamil-language films
Films scored by Yuvan Shankar Raja
Indian romantic comedy films
2006 directorial debut films
2006 romantic comedy films